WTIC may refer to:

 WTIC (AM), a radio station (1080 AM) licensed to Hartford, Connecticut, United States
 WTIC-FM, a radio station (96.5 FM) licensed to Hartford, Connecticut, United States
 WTIC-TV, a television station (channel 34, virtual 61) licensed to Hartford, Connecticut, United States
 The commodity symbol for West Texas Intermediate Crude oil, a.k.a. Texas Sweet Light 
 The callsign of WFSB from 1957 to 1974